Cornthwaite is a surname. Notable people with the surname include:

David Cornthwaite (born 1979), English adventurer, writer, and filmmaker
Robert Cornthwaite (disambiguation), multiple people
Tommy Cornthwaite, English footballer

See also
Norman Cornthwaite Nicholson (1914–1987), English poet